The Tower of Narigües was an albarrana tower in Madrid. Its remains are along the old Muslim wall of Madrid. Located at 83 Calle Mayor, next to the Segovia Viaduct that crosses Calle de Segovia. It was separated from the wall itself, but joined to it through another wall. It served as a watch tower.

Background
It stood until the 19th century.

See also
Tower of the Bones
Muslim Walls of Madrid

References 

History of Madrid
Buildings and structures in Centro District, Madrid
Walls towers in Spain